Hoyt is an English medieval surname, sometimes used as a given name. It is a topographical surname for someone who lived high, or on a hill.

People

Given name
Hoyt Axton (1938–1999), Country singer
Hoyt Curtin (1922–2000), American composer
Hoyt Ming (1902–1985), old-time fiddler
Hoyt Sherman (1827–1904), American banker
Hoyt Patrick Taylor (1890–1964), American politician
Hoyt Patrick Taylor Jr. (1924–2018), American politician
Hoyt Vandenberg (1899–1954), U.S. Air Force general
Hoyt Wilhelm (1922–2002), Hall of fame baseball pitcher
Hoyt Richard "Dick" Murdoch (1946–1996), American professional wrestler

Surname
Adelia M. Hoyt (1865–1966), American librarian, author, and advocate for blind people
Beatrix Hoyt (1880–1963), amateur golfing champion
Clegg Hoyt (1910–1967), American film and television actor
Daniel Hoyt (1681–1764), member of the House of Representatives of the Colony of Connecticut (1734)
Dick and Rick Hoyt, Team Hoyt, with Dick pushing, pulling or carrying his son Rick, who has cerebral palsy, in athletic competitions
Erich Hoyt (born 1950), American-Canadian author and conservationist
George Henry Hoyt (1837–1877), attorney who defended John Brown (abolitionist)
Homer Hoyt (1895–1984), economist
Huested W. R. Hoyt (1842–1894), American politician
James Henry Hoyt (1809–1873), railroad entrepreneur and member of the Connecticut Senate from 1857 to 1858
James Hoyt (baseball) (born 1986), major league baseball pitcher
Jesse Hoyt (1792–1867), New York politician
John Hoyt (1905–1991), actor
John Philo Hoyt (1841–1926), Governor of Arizona Territory (1877-8) and Justice of the Washington Supreme Court (1889-97)
John Wesley Hoyt (1831–1910), Territorial Governor of Wyoming (1878−1882)
LaMarr Hoyt (1955–2021), American baseball player
Lance Hoyt (born 1977), professional wrestler
Matt Hoyt, American film director
Nicholas Hoyt (born 1620), member of the Connecticut General Assembly (1673)
Norris Hoyt, (1935-2013), American lawyer and politician
Oliver Hoyt (1823–1887), American politician
Sam Hoyt (born 1962), American politician
Sarah Hoyt (born 1962), award-winning fiction writer
Waite Hoyt (1899–1984), Hall of Fame baseball pitcher
Walter Hoyt (1618–1698), founding settler of Norwalk, Connecticut
William Hoyt (disambiguation), several people

Fictional characters
Charles Hoyt, a fictional serial killer in the television series Rizzoli & Isles
Emma Hoyt, girlfriend of Gerry Bertier in Remember the Titans played by Kate Bosworth
Lenar Hoyt, Jesuit Priest from the Hyperion cantos
Jake Hoyt, a detective in the movie Training Day portrayed by Ethan Hawke
Jaz Hoyt, a Nazi biker on the HBO drama Oz
Detective Woody Hoyt, on the show Crossing Jordan
Sheriff Hoyt, portrayed by R. Lee Ermey in The Texas Chainsaw Massacre films
Hoyt Fortenberry, on the HBO series True Blood
Hoyt Thorpe, in Tom Wolfe's I am Charlotte Simmons
Hoyt Volker, in the video game Far Cry 3

References